Achala-simha (IAST: Acala-siṃha) was a Sanskrit-language poet from India, who lived in the 12th century or earlier. His verses appear in several anthologies of Sanskrit poems.

Biography  

Achalasimha, sometimes called Achala (IAST: Acala), has been quoted in Subhashita-ratna-kosha of the 12th century anthologist scholar Vidyakara. Therefore, he must have lived in the 12th century or earlier. He may be same as the Buddhist author Achalasimha who wrote a tantric text, but this cannot be said with certainty.

Achalasimha appears to have been a well-known poet of his time. A verse in Sharngadhara-paddhati mentions him alongside other well-known poets, including Amara, Abhinanda and Kalidasa; and dismisses other poets as imitators. He is among the ten most frequently quoted poets in Vidyakara's Subhashita-ratna-kosha.

Example verses 

One of Achalasimha's verses, about a pearl and addressed to a young woman, is included in Vidyakara's Subhashita-ratna-kosha and Bhoja's Shringara-Prakasha. It goes like this (translated by A. K. Warder):

Another verse, about an angry woman, and attributed to Achalasimha by at least four anthologists (including Vidyakara, Shridhara-dasa, Jalhana and Sharangadhara), is as follows (translated by A. K. Warder):

References

Bibliography 

 
 

Sanskrit poets
Indian male poets
Medieval Indian poets